2013 Hockey India League, known as Hero Hockey India League and abbreviated as HIL 2013 was the first season of the field hockey tournament Hockey India League. Tournament was scheduled to start from 5 January to 3 February but was postponed to 14 January to 10 February.

Rules and regulations
Five teams took part in the tournament and each team played three matches against each team, one at their home venue and one at the venue of the opposition team. The third match was played against the other four teams two at home and two away.

The points in the league phase of the tournament were awarded as follows:

If at the end of the League two or more teams had the same number of points for any place, these teams would be ranked according to the following order:
respective number of matches won;
respective goal difference (goals for less goals against). A positive goal difference always takes precedence over a negative one;
respective number of goals scored;
the cumulative results of the two matches played between those two teams taking firstly the points won in the two matches, secondly the goal difference, and thirdly the number of goals scored

Venues
Five venues have been selected for Hockey India League which will serve as home grounds for each franchise:

The semi-final, third and fourth place playoff and the final of 2013 HIL were played on 9 and 10 February at Astroturf Hockey Stadium in Ranchi.

Players

The players' auction for first season of HIL took place on 16 December in New Delhi. A total of 246 players were available for the auction out of which 120 players were bought by the franchises which included 50 foreign and 70 local players.

League progression

Schedule
All matches' timings according to Indian Standard Time (UTC +05:30)

League Phase

Play-offs

Semifinals

Third and fourth place

Final

Awards

Statistics

Leading goalscorers

Hat-tricks

Scoring
First goal of the season: Oskar Deecke for Delhi Waveriders against Punjab Warriors (14 January 2013)
Last goal of the season: Manpreet Singh for Ranchi Rhinos against Delhi Waveriders (10 February 2013)
Largest winning margin: 4 goals
Mumbai Magicians 4–0 Uttar Pradesh Wizards (30 January 2013)
Highest scoring game: 10 goals
Mumbai Magicians 4–6 Delhi Waveriders (21 January 2013)
Most goals scored in a match by a single team: 6 goals
Mumbai Magicians 4–6 Delhi Waveriders (21 January 2013)
Most goals scored in a match by a losing team: 4 goals
Mumbai Magicians 4–6 Delhi Waveriders (21 January 2013)
Ranchi Rhinos 4–5 Delhi Waveriders (23 January 2013)

Clean sheets

Player

Team
Most clean sheets: 3
Uttar Pradesh Wizards
Fewest clean sheets: 0
Punjab Warriors

Discipline

Player
Most green cards: 4
Yuvraj Walmiki (Delhi Waveriders)
Most yellow cards: 2
Manpreet Singh (Ranchi Rhinos)
Pradhan Somanna (Uttar Pradesh Wizards)
Robert Hammond (Punjab Warriors)
Sardara Singh (Delhi Waveriders)
Wouter Jolie (Uttar Pradesh Wizards)
Most red cards: 1
Ranjit Singh (Punjab Warriors)

Team
Most green cards: 15
Delhi Waveriders
Most yellow cards: 7
Mumbai Magicians
Punjab Warriors
Most red cards: 1
Punjab Warriors
Source: Hockey India League

See also
List of Hockey India League players
World Series Hockey

References

External links
Official website

  
Hockey India League seasons
India
Hockey